Salt + Light Television is a Canadian multi-lingual Category B television channel owned by the not-for-profit Salt and Light Catholic Media Foundation and based in Toronto, Ontario. The channel broadcasts faith-based programming for Roman Catholics, which includes televised daily Mass, documentaries, live event coverage and talk shows. Programs are primarily broadcast in English, along with French (under the brand ), Italian and Chinese languages.

The name of the station derives itself from the theme of World Youth Day 2002, "You are the salt of the earth... you are the light of the world,"  part of the Sermon on the Mount (Matthew 5:13-14). The National Director of WYD 2002, Fr. Thomas Rosica, was the chief executive officer of Salt and Light Catholic Media Foundation. Fr. Alan J. Fogarty, S.J., has been appointed chief executive officer effective August 1, 2020.

History

In November 2001, Paolo Canciani (later forming Canbo Broadcasting to operate the future channel) was granted approval from the Canadian Radio-television and Telecommunications Commission (CRTC) to launch Inner Peace Television Network, described as "a national ethnic Category 2 specialty television service devoted to providing religious programming from the single point-of-view of the Roman Catholic faith. The service will target Italian, Spanish, Portuguese, Polish, Filipino, English, and French-speaking audiences. In addition to religious programming, the service will offer a limited amount of programming dealing with social and humanitarian issues."

Prior to the channel's launch, in 2002, ownership and control of the channel was transferred to a consortium, majority owned by St. Joseph Printing Limited.

The channel launched in July 2003 as Salt + Light Television and was quickly spun-off as a non-profit company under the ownership of Salt and Light Catholic Media Foundation, a newly formed charitable organization ran by a board of directors, two of which were from the Gagliano family, who in turn controlled St. Joseph Printing Limited. Upon launch, the channel initially aired programming in English, French, Italian, Spanish, and Portuguese; which has since changed to its current language list. In addition to television, Salt + Light publishes a magazine.

On June 1, 2017, the channel announced that it would be launching a high definition (HD) feed on June 4, 2017, initially with Telus Optik TV. Gabriel Chow, the developer of the GCatholic.org, is a contributor (primarily Chinese language) to the channel.

See also
2003 in Canadian television
Salt and light metaphor
CatholicTV
Padre Pio TV
Eternal Word Television Network
H2onews
Catholic television
Catholic television channels
Catholic television networks
List of Canadian television channels
Television in Canada

References

External links

Télévision Sel + Lumière 

English-language television stations in Canada
Catholic television channels
Religious television networks in Canada
Television channels and stations established in 2003
Digital cable television networks in Canada